The 2014 season of the astronomy TV show Star Gazers starring Dean Regas, James Albury, and Marlene Hidalgo started on January 6, 2014. Marlene Hidalgo's final appearance on the show was in episode 14-13 which first aired on March 31, 2014.  The show's episode numbering scheme changed several times during its run to coincide with major events in the show's history. The official Star Gazer website hosts the complete scripts for each of the shows.


2014 season

References

External links 
  Star Gazer official website
 

Lists of Jack Horkheimer: Star Gazer episodes
2014 American television seasons
2014 in American television